Athletes from East Germany (German Democratic Republic) competed at the 1980 Summer Olympics in Moscow, USSR. 346 competitors, 222 men and 124 women, took part in 167 events in 17 sports.

Medalists

Athletics

Men's Competition
Men's 100 metres
Eugen Ray
 Heat — 10.38
 Quarterfinals — 10.30
 Semifinals — 10.47 (→ did not advance)
Sören Schlegel
 Heat — 10.44
 Quarterfinals — 10.28 (→ did not advance)
Klaus-Dieter Kurrat
 Heat — 10.53
 Quarterfinals — 10.54 (→ did not advance)

Men's 800 metres
Andreas Busse
 Heat — 1:47.4 
 Semifinals — 1:46.9
 Final — 1:46.9 (→ 5th place)
Detlef Wagenknecht
 Heat — 1:47.5 
 Semifinals — 1:46.7
 Final — 1:47.0 (→ 6th place)
Olaf Beyer
 Heat — 1:48.9 
 Semifinals — 1:47.6 (→ did not advance)

Men's 1,500 metres
Jürgen Straub
 Heat — 3:37.0 
 Semifinals — 3:39.4
 Final — 3:38.8 (→  Silver Medal)
Andreas Busse
 Heat — 3:44.3 
 Semifinals — 3:43.5
 Final — 3:40.2 (→ 4th place)

Men's 10,000 metres
 Jörg Peter
 Heat — 28:50.0
 Final — 28:05.5 (→ 6th place)
 Werner Schildhauer
 Heat — 28:32.1
 Final — 28:11.0 (→ 7th place)

Men's Marathon
 Waldemar Cierpinski
 Final — 2:11:03 (→  Gold Medal)
 Hans-Joachim Truppel
 Final — 2:14:55 (→ 11th place)
 Jürgen Eberding
 Final — 2:18:04 (→ 21st place)

Men's 4x400 metres Relay
 Klaus Thiele, Andreas Knebel, Frank Schaffer, and Volker Beck
 Heat — 3:03.4
 Final — 3:01.3 (→  Silver Medal)

Men's 110 m Hurdles
 Thomas Munkelt
 Heat — 13.55
 Semifinals — 13.49
 Final — 13.39 (→  Gold  Medal)
 Thomas Dittrich
 Heat — 13.93
 Semifinals — 13.90 (→ did not advance)
 Andreas Schlißke
 Heat — 14.18
 Semifinals — 14.60 (→ did not advance)

Men's 400 m Hurdles
 Volker Beck
 Heat — 50.35
 Semifinals — 50.36
 Final — 48.70 (→  Gold  Medal)

Men's 3,000 m Steeplechase
 Ralf Pönitsch
 Heat — 8:56.5 (→ did not advance)

Men's Pole Vault
 Axel Weber
 Qualification — 5.15 m (→ did not advance)

Men's Long Jump
 Lutz Dombrowski
 Qualification — 8.17 m
 Final — 8.54 m (→  Gold  Medal)
 Frank Paschek
 Qualification — 8.17 m
 Final — 8.21 m (→  Silver  Medal)
 Peter Rieger
 Qualification — 7.59 m (→ did not advance)

Men's High Jump
 Gerd Wessig
 Qualification — 2.21 m
 Final — 2.36 m (→  Gold  Medal)
 Jörg Freimuth
 Qualification — 2.21 m
 Final — 2.31 m (→  Bronze  Medal)
 Henry Lauterbach
 Qualification — 2.21 m
 Final — 2.29 m (→ 4th place)

Men's Discus Throw
 Wolfgang Schmidt
 Qualification — 62.46 m
 Final — 65.64 m (→ 4th place)
 Hilmar Hossfeld
 Qualification — 59.92 m
 Final — 61.14 m (→ 11th place)
 Armin Lemme
 Qualification — 59.44 m (→ did not advance, 13th place)

Men's Shot Put
 Udo Beyer
 Qualification — 19.94 m
 Final — 21.06 m (→  Bronze Medal)
 Hans-Jürgen Jacobi
 Qualification — 19.92 m
 Final — 20.32 m (→ 6th place)

Men's Javelin Throw
 Wolfgang Hanisch
 Qualification — 85.82 m
 Final — 86.72 m (→  Bronze Medal)
 Detlef Fuhrmann
 Qualification — 78.80 m
 Final — 83.50 m (→ 7th place)
 Detlef Michel
 Qualification — 78.34 m (→ did not advance, 13th place)

Men's Hammer Throw
 Roland Steuk
 Qualification — 73.52 m
 Final — 77.54 m (→ 4th place)
 Detlef Gerstenberg
 Qualification — 75.04 m
 Final — 74.60 m (→ 5th place)

Men's Decathlon
 Steffen Grummt
 Final — 7892 points (→ 8th place)
 Siegfried Stark
 Final — retired (→ no ranking)
 Rainer Pottel
 Final — retired (→ no ranking)

Men's 20 km Walk
Roland Wieser
 Final — 1:25:58.2 (→  Bronze Medal)
Karl-Heinz Stadtmüller
 Final — 1:29:21.7 (→ 8th place)
Werner Heyer
 Final — DSQ (→ no ranking)

Men's 50 km Walk
Hartwig Gauder
 Final — 3:49:24 (→  Gold Medal)
Dietmar Meisch
 Final — DSQ (→ no ranking)
Uwe Dünkel
 Final — DSQ (→ no ranking)

Women's Competition
Women's 100 metres
 Marlies Göhr
 Heat — 11.41
 Quarterfinals — 11.12
 Semifinals — 11.18
 Final — 11.07 (→  Silver Medal)
 Ingrid Auerswald
 Heat — 11.32
 Quarterfinals — 11.09
 Semifinals — 11.27
 Final — 11.14 (→  Bronze Medal)
 Romy Müller
 Heat — 11.41
 Quarterfinals — 11.12
 Semifinals — 11.22
 Final — 11.16 (→ 5th place)

Women's 800 metres
 Martina Kämpfert
 Heat — 1:58.8 
 Semifinals — 1:58.1
 Final — 1:56.3 (→ 4th place)
 Hildegard Ullrich
 Heat — 2:00.1 
 Semifinals — 1:58.7
 Final — 1:57.2 (→ 5th place)

Women's 1,500 metres
 Christiane Wartenberg
 Heat — 4:00.4
 Final — 3:57.8 (→  Silver  Medal)
 Ulrike Bruns
 Heat — 4:01.6 
 Final — 4:00.7 (→ 5th place)
 Beate Liebich
 Heat — 4:06.8 (→ did not advance)

Women's 100 m Hurdles
 Johanna Schaller-Klier
 Heat — 13.03
 Semifinal — 12.77
 Final — 12.63 (→  Silver Medal)
 Kerstin Knabe
 Heat — 12.77
 Semifinal — 12.99
 Final — 12.66 (→ 4th place)
 Bettine Gärtz
 Heat — 13.06
 Semifinal — 13.04
 Final — 13.14 (→ 7th place)

Women's Long Jump
 Brigitte Wujak
 Qualification — 6.65 m
 Final — 7.04 m (→  Silver Medal)
 Siegrun Siegl
 Qualification — 6.53 m
 Final — 6.87 m (→ 5th place)
 Siegrid Heimann
 Qualification — 6.71 m
 Final — 6.71 m (→ 7th place)

Women's High Jump
 Jutta Kirst
 Qualification — 1.88 m 
 Final — 1.94 m (→  Bronze Medal)
 Rosemarie Ackermann
 Qualification — 1.88 m
 Final — 1.91 m (→ 4th place)
 Andrea Reichstein
 Qualification — 1.88 m
 Final — 1.91 m (→ 6th place)

Women's Discus Throw
 Evelin Jahl
 Qualification — 60.22 m
 Final — 69.96 m (→  Gold  Medal)
 Gisela Beyer
 Qualification — 62.86 m
 Final — 67.08 m (→ 4th place)
 Margitta Pufe
 Qualification — 65.52 m
 Final — 66.12 m (→ 5th place)

Women's Javelin Throw
 Ute Hommola
 Qualification — 63.52 m
 Final — 66.56 m (→  Bronze Medal)
 Ute Richter
 Qualification — 66.66 m
 Final — 66.54 m (→ 4th place)
 Ruth Fuchs
 Qualification — 64.26 m
 Final — 63.94 m (→ 8th place)

Women's Shot Put
 Ilona Slupianek
 Final — 22.41 m (→  Gold Medal)
 Margitta Pufe
 Final — 21.20 m (→  Bronze  Medal)
 Ines Reichenbach
 Final — 19.66 m (→ 8th place)

Women's Pentathlon
 Ramona Neubert — 4698 points (→ 4th place)
 100 metres — 13.93s
 Shot Put — 13.68m 
 High Jump — 1.77m 
 Long Jump — 6.63m 
 800 metres — 2:07.70
 Burglinde Pollak — 4553 points (→ 6th place)
 100 metres — 13.74s
 Shot Put — 16.67m 
 High Jump — 1.68m 
 Long Jump — 5.93m 
 800 metres — 2:14.40
 Christine Laser — 1712 points (→ no ranking)
 100 metres — 13.67s
 Shot Put — 13.39m 
 High Jump — DNF

Boxing

Men's Light Flyweight (– 48 kg)
Dietmar Geilich
 First Round — Defeated Thapa Birender Singh (India) on points (3–2) 
 Second Round — Defeated Pedro Manuel Nieves (Venezuela) on points (5–0) 
 Quarter Finals — Lost to Shamil Sabirov (Soviet Union) on points (1–4) 

Men's Bantamweight (– 54 kg)
Mario Behrendt
 First Round — Lost to Dumitru Cipere (Romania) on points (0–5)

Men's Featherweight (– 57 kg)
Rudi Fink →  Gold Medal
 First Round — Defeated Hannu Kaislama (Finland) on points (5–0)
 Second Round — Defeated Esmail Mohamad (Afghanistan) after knock-out in first round
 Third Round — Defeated Carlos González (Mexico) after knock-out in first round
 Quarter Finals — Defeated Winfred Kabunda (Zambia) on points (4–1)
 Semi Finals — Defeated Viktor Rybakov (Soviet Union) on points (4–1)
 Final — Defeated Adolfo Horta (Cuba) on points (4–1)

Men's Lightweight (– 60 kg)
Richard Nowakowski →  Bronze Medal
 First Round — Defeated Christopher Ossai (Nigeria) on points (5–0)
 Second Round — Defeated Geofrey Nyeko (Uganda) after referee stopped contest in first round 
 Quarter Finals — Defeated George Gilbody (Great Britain) on points (5–0)
 Semi Finals — Lost to Viktor Demyanenko (Soviet Union) after referee stopped contest in first round 

Men's Light-Welterweight (– 63,5 kg)
Dietmar Schwarz
 First Round — Defeated Teddy Makofi (Zambia) on points (5–0) 
 Second Round — Lost to José Angel Molina (Puerto Rico) after referee stopped contest in third round

Men's Heavyweight (+ 81 kg)
Jürgen Fanghänel →  Bronze Medal
 First Round — Defeated Luis Castillo (Ecuador) on points (4–1)
 Quarter Finals — Defeated Petr Stoimenov (Bulgaria) after referee stopped contest in second round
 Semi Finals — Lost to Piotr Zaev (Soviet Union) on points (0–5)

Canoeing

East Germany was represented by 13 canoeists, 10 men and 3 women.

Cycling

Thirteen cyclists represented East Germany in 1980.

Individual road race
 Thomas Barth
 Andreas Petermann
 Olaf Ludwig
 Bernd Drogan

Team time trial
 Falk Boden
 Bernd Drogan
 Olaf Ludwig
 Hans-Joachim Hartnick

Sprint
 Lutz Heßlich

1000m time trial
 Lothar Thoms

Individual pursuit
 Harald Wolf

Team pursuit
 Gerald Mortag
 Uwe Unterwalder
 Matthias Wiegand
 Volker Winkler

Diving

Men's Springboard
Falk Hoffmann
 Preliminary Round — 567.78 points (→ 3rd place)
 Final — 858.510 points (→ 4th place)
Frank Taubert
 Preliminary Round — 524.04 points (→ 9th place, did not advance)
Dieter Waskow
 Preliminary Round — 522.87 points (→ 10th place, did not advance)

Men's Platform
Falk Hoffmann
 Preliminary Round — 546.12 points (→ 1st place)
 Final — 835.650 points (→  Gold Medal)
Dieter Waskow
 Preliminary Round — 515.16 points (→ 6th place)
 Final — 802.800 points (→ 5th place)
Thomas Knuths
 Preliminary Round — 521.01 points (→ 3rd place)
 Final — 783.975 points (→ 6th place)

Women's Springboard
Martina Proeber
 Preliminary Round — 450.99 points (→ 3rd place)
 Final — 698.895 points (→  Silver Medal)
Karin Guthke
 Preliminary Round — 435.21 points (→ 4th place)
 Final — 685.245 points (→  Bronze Medal)
Martina Jäschke
 Preliminary Round — 427.47 points (→ 6th place)
 Final — 668.115 points (→ 5th place)

Women's Platform
Martina Jäschke
 Preliminary Round — 359.88 points (→ 4th place)
 Final — 596.250 points (→  Gold Medal)
Ramona Wenzel
 Preliminary Round — 358.86 points (→ 6th place)
 Final — 542.070 points (→ 4th place)
Kerstin Krause
 Preliminary Round — 322.68 points (→ 9th place, did not advance)

Fencing

14 fencers, 10 men and 4 women, represented East Germany in 1980.

Men's foil
 Hartmuth Behrens
 Klaus Kotzmann
 Klaus Haertter

Men's team foil
 Siegmar Gutzeit, Hartmuth Behrens, Adrian Germanus, Klaus Kotzmann, Klaus Haertter

Men's sabre
 Frank-Eberhard Höltje
 Peter Ulbrich
 Rüdiger Müller

Men's team sabre
 Rüdiger Müller, Hendrik Jung, Peter Ulbrich, Frank-Eberhard Höltje, Gerd May

Women's foil
 Mandy Niklaus
 Gabriele Janke
 Sabine Hertrampf

Women's team foil
 Mandy Niklaus, Gabriele Janke, Sabine Hertrampf, Beate Schubert

Football

Preliminary round

Bracket

The final was played in a hard rain for the third straight Olympics. Both teams played with ten players after the 58th minute after one player from each team was red-carded.

Gymnastics

Handball

Men's Team Competition
Preliminary Round (Group A)
 Defeated Spain (21–17)
 Drew with Hungary (14–14)
 Defeated Cuba (27–20)
 Defeated Poland (22–21)
 Defeated Denmark (24–20)
Classification Match
 Final: Defeated Soviet Union (23–22) →  Gold Medal
Team Roster
 Siegfried Voigt
 Günter Dreibrodt
 Peter Rost
 Klaus Gruner
 Hans-Georg Beyer
 Dietmar Schmidt
 Hartmut Krüger
 Lothar Doering
 Ernst Gerlach
 Frank-Michael Wahl
 Ingolf Wiegert
 Wieland Schmidt
 Rainer Höft
 Hans-Georg Jaunich

Women's Team Competition
Results
 Defeated Czechoslovakia (16–10)
 Drew with Yugoslavia (15–15)
 Defeated People's Rep. of Congo (28–6)
 Defeated Hungary (19–9)
 Lost again USSR (13–18)
East Germany won  Bronze Medal
Team Roster
 Birgit Heinecke
 Roswitha Krause
 Waltraud Kretzschmar
 Katrin Krüger
 Kornelia Kunisch
 Evelyn Matz
 Kristina Richter
 Christina Rost
 Sabine Röther
 Renate Rudolph
 Marion Tietz
 Petra Uhlig
 Claudia Wunderlich
 Hannelore Zober

Judo

Rowing

Sailing

Shooting

Swimming

Men's 100m Freestyle
Frank Kühne
 Heats — 52.93 (→ did not advance)

Men's 200m Freestyle
Frank Kühne
 Heats — 1:53.63 (→ did not advance)
Detlev Grabs
 Heats — 1:53.38 (→ did not advance)

Women's 100 m Breaststroke
Bettina Löbel
 Heats — 1:14.32 (→ did not advance)
Silvia Rinka
 Heats — 1:12.88 (→ did not advance)Women's 400 m Individual MedleyPetra Schneider
 Heats — 4:46.53 
 Final — 4:36.29 (→  Gold Medal)
Grit Slaby
 Heats — 4:52.01 
 Final — 4:48.54 (→ 4th place)
Ulrike Tauber
 Heats — 4:51.97
 Final — 4:49.18 (→ 5th place)

Volleyball

Women's Team CompetitionPreliminary Round (Group A) Defeated Cuba (3–1)
 Lost to Soviet Union (1–3)
 Defeated Peru (3–2)Final Lost to Soviet Union (1–3) →  Silver MedalTeam Roster Ute Kostrzewa
 Andrea Heim
 Annette Schultz
 Christine Mummhardt
 Heike Lehmann
 Barbara Czekalla
 Karla Roffeis
 Martina Schmidt
 Anke Westendorf
 Karin Püschel
 Brigitte Fetzer
 Katharina Bullin

Weightlifting-56 kg category Andreas Letz
 Snatch: 115.0 kg, Clean and jerk: 150.0 kg
 Total: 265.0 kg (→ 4th place)-67.5 kg category Joachim Kunz
 Snatch: 145.0 kg, Clean and jerk: 190.0 kg
 Total: 335.0 kg →  Silver Medal Gunter Ambrass
 Total: 320.0 kg (→ 4th place)-90 kg category Frank Mantek
 Snatch: 165.0 kg, Clean and jerk: 205.0 kg
 Total: 370.0 kg →  Bronze Medal-100 kg category Michael Hennig
 Total: 362.5 kg (→ 4th place)
 Manfred Funke
 Total: 377.5 kg (→ 6th place)+110 kg category Jürgen Heuser
 Snatch: 182.5 kg, Clean and jerk: 227.5 kg
 Total: 410.0 kg →  Silver Medal'''

Wrestling

References 

Germany, East
1980
Summer Olympics
1980 in German sport